In mathematics, the (right) Ziegler spectrum of a ring R is a topological space whose points are (isomorphism classes of) indecomposable pure-injective right R-modules. Its closed subsets correspond to theories of modules closed under arbitrary products and direct summands. Ziegler spectra are named after Martin Ziegler, who first defined and studied them in 1984.

Definition 

Let R be a ring (associative, with 1, not necessarily commutative). A (right) pp-n-formula is a formula in the language of (right) R-modules of the form

 

has the sets

 

as subbasis of open sets, where  range over
(right) pp-1-formulae and  denotes the subgroup of  consisting of all elements that satisfy the one-variable formula . One can show that these sets form a basis.

Properties 

Ziegler spectra are rarely Hausdorff and often fail to have the -property. However they are always compact and have a basis of compact open sets given by the sets  where  are pp-1-formulae.

When the ring R is countable  is sober. It is not currently known if all Ziegler spectra are sober.

Generalization 
Ivo Herzog showed in 1997 how to define the Ziegler spectrum of a locally coherent Grothendieck category, which generalizes the construction above.

References 

Model theory